Ryan Ashley Radmanovich (born August 9, 1971 in Calgary, Alberta, Canada) is a Canadian former baseball outfielder. He played part of one season in Major League Baseball (MLB), appearing in 25 games for the Seattle Mariners in 1998, primarily as a right fielder.

Career
Radmanovich is a graduate of Pepperdine University. He was drafted by the Minnesota Twins (14th round, 401 overall) in the 1993 MLB draft. Radmanovich went on to play 25 games with the Seattle Mariners. He finished his professional playing career with the Bridgeport Bluefish of the Atlantic League of Professional Baseball in 2009.

He was a starting right fielder for Team Canada in the 2004 Summer Olympic Games in Athens, Greece. He also played for Canada in the 2006 World Baseball Classic, and was named to the 2008 Canadian Olympic Baseball team.

See also
 List of Major League Baseball players from Canada

References

External links

Sports Illustrated
Pura Pelota (Venezuelan Winter League)
Olympics Sports Reference
Player Press

1971 births
Living people
Allan Hancock Bulldogs baseball players
Baseball people from Alberta
Baseball players at the 1999 Pan American Games
Baseball players at the 2004 Summer Olympics
Baseball players at the 2008 Summer Olympics
Bridgeport Bluefish players
Canadian expatriate baseball players in Mexico
Canadian expatriate baseball players in the United States
Canadian people of Serbian descent
Edmonton Cracker-Cats players
Fort Myers Miracle players
Fort Wayne Wizards players
Hardware City Rock Cats players
Las Vegas Stars (baseball) players
Major League Baseball right fielders
Major League Baseball players from Canada
Mexican League baseball center fielders
Mexican League baseball left fielders
Nashville Sounds players
Navegantes del Magallanes players
Canadian expatriate baseball players in Venezuela
Olympic baseball players of Canada
Pan American Games bronze medalists for Canada
Pan American Games medalists in baseball
Pepperdine Waves baseball players
Portland Beavers players
Salt Lake Buzz players
Seattle Mariners players
Somerset Patriots players
Sportspeople from Calgary
Sultanes de Monterrey players
Tacoma Rainiers players
Tigres de Aragua players
World Baseball Classic players of Canada
2006 World Baseball Classic players
Medalists at the 1999 Pan American Games